Satish Chandra is a given name of Hindu origin, and may refer to,

 Satish Chandra (politician), Indian National Congress leader
 Satish Chandra (historian), Indian academic
 Satish Chandra Agarwal, Indian politician
 Satish Chandra Basumatary, Indian Bodo-language writer
 Satish Chandra Dubey, Indian politician
 Satish Chandra Kakati, Indian journalist
 Satish Chandra Maheshwari, Indian botanist
 Satish Chandra Mukherjee, Indian educationist 
 Satish Chandra Roy, Bangladeshi  politician
 Satish Chandra Samanta, Indian politician
 Satish Chandra Sharma, Indian judge
 Satish Chandra Vidyabhusan, Indian academic

Indian  masculine given names